Trial of Ned Kelly is a 1977 Australian TV film about a hypothetical trial of Ned Kelly.

References

External links

Trial of Ned Kelly at Screen Australia

Australian television films
1977 television films
1977 films
1970s English-language films
1970s Australian films